Kai Wessel may refer to:

 Kai Wessel (countertenor), German countertenor
 Kai Wessel (director), German film director